Epicauta caviceps is a species of blister beetle in the family Meloidae. It is found in North America.

References

 Pinto, John D. (1991). "The Taxonomy of North American Epicauta (Coleoptera: Meloidae), with a Revision of the Nominate Subgenus and a Survey of Courtship Behavior". University of California Publications in Entomology, vol. 110, x + 372.

Further reading

 Arnett, R. H. Jr., M. C. Thomas, P. E. Skelley and J. H. Frank. (eds.). (21 June 2002). American Beetles, Volume II: Polyphaga: Scarabaeoidea through Curculionoidea. CRC Press LLC, Boca Raton, Florida .
 
 Richard E. White. (1983). Peterson Field Guides: Beetles. Houghton Mifflin Company.

Meloidae
Beetles described in 1873